Donald John Trump Jr. (born December 31, 1977) is an American political activist, businessman, author, and former television presenter. He is the eldest child of Donald Trump, 45th president of the United States from 2017 to 2021, and his first wife Ivana Trump.

Trump serves as a trustee and executive vice president of The Trump Organization, running the company alongside his younger brother Eric. During their father's presidency, the brothers continued to do deals and investments in foreign countries, as well as collect payments in their U.S. properties from foreign governments, despite a pledge that they would not do so. Trump also served as a boardroom judge on his father's TV show The Apprentice. He authored Triggered in 2019 and Liberal Privilege in 2020.

Trump was active in his father's 2016 presidential campaign. He cooperated with Russia in their interference in the 2016 United States elections and had a meeting with a Russian lawyer who promised damaging information about the campaign of Hillary Clinton in the 2016 presidential election. Trump campaigned for several Republicans during the 2018 midterm elections. He has promoted several conspiracy theories.

Trump was also active in his father's 2020 presidential campaign, often being on the campaign trail and being featured in the news for making unfounded claims. During the election he called for "total war" as the results were counted and promoted the stolen election conspiracy theory. Following his father's defeat, he engaged in attempts to overturn the results. He spoke at the rally that led to the storming of the Capitol, where he threatened Trump's opponents that "we're coming for you." In January 2021, Attorney General for the District of Columbia Karl Racine said that he is looking at whether to charge Donald Trump Jr. with inciting the violent attack on the U.S. Capitol in the criminal investigation into the attack. CNN reported in April 2022 that two days after the election, Trump Jr. sent a text message to White House Chief of Staff Mark Meadows outlining paths to subvert the Electoral College process and ensure his father a second term.

Early life
Trump was born on December 31, 1977, in Manhattan, New York City, to Ivana and Donald Trump. He has two younger siblings, Ivanka and Eric. He also has two half siblings, Tiffany, from his father's marriage to Marla Maples, and Barron, from his father's current marriage to Melania Trump. Through his father, Trump is a grandson of Fred Trump and great-grandson of Elizabeth Christ Trump, who founded what became the Trump Organization. As a boy, Trump found a role model in his maternal grandfather, Miloš Zelníček, who had a home near Prague, where he spent summers camping, fishing, hunting and learning the Czech language.

His parents divorced when he was 12 years old due to his father having an extramarital affair. Trump Jr. was estranged from his father for one year after the divorce, furious at his actions which broke up the family.

Trump was educated at Buckley School and The Hill School, a college preparatory boarding school in Pottstown, Pennsylvania, followed by the University of Pennsylvania's (Penn) Wharton School, where he graduated in 2000 with a B.S. in Economics.

Career

After graduating from Penn in 2000, Trump moved to Aspen, Colorado, where he hunted, fished, skied, lived in a truck, and worked as a bartender for a year, before returning to join the Trump Organization in New York. Trump has supervised building projects, which included 40 Wall Street, Trump International Hotel and Tower, and Trump Park Avenue, In 2006 he helped launch Trump Mortgage, which collapsed less than a year later. In 2010, he became a spokesperson and "executive director of global branding" for Cambridge Who's Who, a vanity publisher against whom hundreds of complaints had already been filed with the Better Business Bureau. He appeared as a guest adviser and judge on many episodes of his father's reality television show The Apprentice, from season 5 in 2006 to his father's last season in 2015.

Trump Organization
On January 11, 2017, Trump's father announced that he and his brother Eric would oversee a trust that included the Trump Organization's assets while his father was president, to avert a conflict of interest.

Amid the Trump–Ukraine scandal – where Trump asked the Ukrainian president to investigate Joe Biden and his son Hunter BidenTrump Jr. strongly criticized Hunter Biden, accusing him of nepotism and leveraging his father as a means to get financial benefits. Trump Jr. said, "When you're the father and your son's entire career is dependent on that, they own you." Trump Jr. was widely ridiculed for these remarks by Trevor Noah and others. Trump Jr. is a high-level executive in his father's business and has continued to operate and promote the family's businesses across the world during Trump's presidency. The Associated Press wrote of Trump Jr.'s, remarks that he was "showing no self-awareness that he, too, has at least in part been successful because of a famous father". According to The Washington Post fact-checker, Trump Jr.'s assertion that he and his family members had gotten out of foreign business deals after Trump became president is false. The Washington Post reported that after Trump became president, "Trump's sons have been busy selling assets to foreign individuals, expanding or adding onto their existing deals and investments in foreign countries, and collecting payments in U.S. properties from foreign governments."

In February 2018, advertisements in Indian newspapers promoted a deal whereby anyone who purchased Trump Organization apartments in Gurgaon before February 20 would be invited to have a "conversation and dinner" with Trump Jr. The ads were criticized by corruption watchdogs as unethical.

Involvement in politics

2016 presidential campaign

Ahead of the 2016 presidential election, Trump Jr. was a central member of his father's campaign, characterized by The New York Times as a "close political adviser". He spoke at the Republican National Convention, along with his siblings Ivanka, Eric and Tiffany.

Trump Jr. influenced his father's choice of Secretary of the Interior Ryan Zinke during the presidential transition. Since his father's victory in the 2016 election, Trump Jr. has developed what The Washington Post calls a "public persona as a right-wing provocateur and ardent defender of Trumpism". The Atlantic reported in 2019 that Trump had described Trump Jr. in 2017 as "not the sharpest knife in the drawer." Trump Jr. earned the nickname "Fredo" among some Trump campaign staffers, a reference to a character in The Godfather.

Veselnitskaya meeting

On June 9, 2016, Trump Jr. attended a meeting arranged by publicist Rob Goldstone on behalf of Azerbaijani-Russian businessman Emin Agalarov. The meeting was held in Trump Tower in Manhattan, among three members of the presidential campaign: Trump Jr., Jared Kushner, and Paul Manafortand Russian lawyer Natalia Veselnitskaya, her translator Anatoli Samochornov, Russian-American lobbyist Rinat Akhmetshin, and Ike Kaveladze, a Georgian-American, U.S.-based senior vice president at Crocus Group, the real estate development company run by Aras Agalarov.

Approximately a year later, Trump Jr. initially told the media that adoption of Russian children was the main subject of the meeting. On July 8, 2017, Trump Jr. tweeted his email exchange with Goldstone. It revealed that Trump Jr. had agreed to attend the meeting with the understanding he would receive information damaging to Hillary Clinton. Goldstone also wrote in one of Trump Jr.'s publicly disclosed emails that the Russian government was involved. Robert Mueller, the special counsel of the Department of Justice in charge of Russia-related investigations, investigated the emails and the meeting. Although the White House lauded Trump Jr. for his transparency, he released the e-mails only after The New York Times had informed him that they had them and were going to publish a story about them.

In June 2019, Republicans and Democrats on the Senate Intelligence Committee made a criminal referral of Trump Jr. to federal prosecutors on suspicions that he misled the committee with his testimony.

Meeting with Gulf states emissary
Trump Jr. had a meeting in August 2016 with an emissary for the United Arab Emirates and Saudi Arabia who offered help to the Trump presidential campaign. The meeting included Joel Zamel, an Israeli specialist in social media manipulation; George Nader, an envoy representing the crown princes of the United Arab Emirates and Saudi Arabia; and American businessman Erik Prince.

Correspondence with WikiLeaks
In November 2017, news broke that Julian Assange had used the WikiLeaks Twitter account to correspond with Donald Trump Jr. during the 2016 presidential election. Trump Jr. had already provided this correspondence to congressional investigators who were looking into Russian interference in the 2016 election.

The correspondence showed that WikiLeaks actively solicited the cooperation of Trump Jr., who was a campaign surrogate and advisor in the campaign of his father. WikiLeaks urged the Trump campaign to reject the results of the 2016 presidential election at a time when it appeared the Trump campaign would lose. WikiLeaks asked Trump Jr. to share an unsubstantiated claim that Hillary Clinton had wanted to attack Assange with drones. WikiLeaks also shared a link to a website that would help people search through Clinton campaign manager John Podesta's hacked e-mails, which Wikileaks had recently made public. Trump Jr. shared both.

2018 midterm election campaigns
During the 2018 midterms election cycle, Trump actively campaigned on behalf of Republican candidates, including for Matt Rosendale, Patrick Morrisey, Mike Braun, Ron DeSantis, Lee Zeldin and Matt Gaetz. He raised millions of dollars for Republican candidates, was second only to his father in his ability to draw crowds to campaign events, and is credited with helping Republican candidates win.

Other political activities
In 2007, Trump Jr. gave $4,000 to then-Senator Hillary Clinton's campaign to be the Democratic presidential nominee.

In 2011, Trump Jr. responded to criticism of the Tea Party movement by Florida representative Frederica Wilson by confusing Wilson with California representative Maxine Waters and saying her colorful hats made her look like a stripper.

In April 2017, he campaigned for Montana congressional candidate Greg Gianforte, and in May met with Republican National Committee officials to discuss the party's strategy and resources.

In September 2017, Trump Jr. asked to have his Secret Service detail removed, telling friends he wanted more privacy, the second presidential child to do so. The request was criticized by former Secret Service agents. Trump Jr.'s protection was restored later that month.

In October 2020, it was reported that Pennsylvania Republicans were suggesting Trump Jr. run for the vacant Senate seat in Pennsylvania in 2022 after two-term incumbent Pat Toomey announced he would not be seeking re-election. In the same month, Trump Jr. held a crowded indoor rally where attendees did not wear masks, contradicting public health guidelines.

In an October 29 interview with Fox News's Laura Ingraham, Trump Jr. asserted that the coronavirus death rate has dropped to "almost nothing", adding "(b)ecause we've gotten control of this thing. We understand how it works – they have the therapeutics to be able to deal with this. If you look at that, look at my Instagram, it's gone down to almost nothing." On that day, the number of coronavirus deaths in the U.S. was 1,063.

Trump has been the subject of speculation for a 2024 run for president. In October 2020, he posted a photo to his Instagram account of a "Don Jr. 2024" flag.

Views and controversies

Race and immigration 
During his father's presidential campaign, Trump Jr. caused controversy in 2016 when he posted an image that compared refugees to Skittles, saying "If I had a bowl of Skittles and I told you just three would kill you, would you take a handful? That's our Syrian refugee problem." The makers of Skittles condemned the tweet, saying "Skittles are candy. Refugees are people. We don't feel it's an appropriate analogy." The Cato Institute claimed that year that the chances "an American would be killed in a terrorist attack committed by a refugee was one in 3.64 billion" per year.

On March 1, 2016, an interview with white supremacist James Edwards and Trump Jr. was aired. The campaign initially denied the interview had taken place; later Trump Jr. claimed it was unintentional. As a consequence of the interview, mainstream media outlets have accused Trump Jr. of being either a believer in the white genocide conspiracy theory, or pretending to be an advocate for political gain.

In September 2016, Trump Jr. cited Holocaust imagery to criticize what he perceived as the mainstream media's uncritical coverage of Hillary Clinton during her campaign, by "letting her slide on every discrepancy", while also accusing Democrats involved in the 2016 campaign of lying. Trump Jr. said if the Republicans were committing the same offences mainstream outlets would be "warming up the gas chamber right now". Also that month, Trump Jr. shared an image on Instagram depicting a cross between his father and Pepe the Frog. When asked on Good Morning America about Pepe the Frog and its associations with white supremacy, Trump Jr. said he had never heard of Pepe the Frog and thought it was just a "frog with a wig".

In April 2017, Trump Jr. lauded conspiracy theorist Mike Cernovich, who has promoted the debunked white genocide and Pizzagate conspiracy theories, saying, "In a long gone time of unbiased journalism he'd win the Pulitzer".

In August 2020, the Southern Poverty Law Center reported that Trump Jr. appeared at a far-right "We Build the Wall" event with Neo-Nazi collaborator Jack Posobiec in July 2019.

Promotion of conspiracy theories 
Trump Jr. retweeted conspiratorial remarks by white supremacist Kevin B. MacDonald about alleged favors exchanged by Hillary Clinton and Switzerland's largest bank. On the campaign trail, Trump Jr. promoted Alex Jones' conspiracy theory that Hillary Clinton wore an earpiece to a presidential forum and that official unemployment rates were manipulated for political purposes.

In March 2017, Trump Jr. criticized the mayor of London, Sadiq Khan, after the 2017 Westminster attack, which in turn led British lawmakers to criticize Trump Jr. British journalists said Trump Jr. had quoted Khan out of context when he criticized him. Khan did not respond to the criticism, saying he had "far more important things" to do.

In May 2017, Trump Jr. promoted what CNN called the "long-debunked, far-right conspiracy theory" that Bill Clinton was linked to Vince Foster's death. In November, Trump Jr. again promoted the conspiracy theory that the Clintons had murdered people.

In February 2018, Trump Jr. liked two tweets promoting a conspiracy theory that survivors of the Stoneman Douglas High School shooting were coached into propagating anti-Trump rhetoric.

In May 2018, Trump Jr. retweeted a false and antisemitic conspiracy theory that George Soros, the Jewish Hungarian-American businessman and philanthropist, was a "nazi [sic] who turned in his fellow Jews to be murdered in German concentration camps & stole their wealth". The tweets originated from Roseanne Barr, whose TV show Roseanne was canceled the same day after she had posted a series of racist and antisemitic tweets. A spokesperson for Soros responded to the tweets, "George Soros survived the Nazi occupation of Hungary as a 13-year-old child by going into hiding and assuming a false identity with the help of his father, who managed to save his own family and help many other Jews survive the Holocaust."

In June 2018, Trump Jr. liked a tweet suggesting that the migrant children separated from their parents due to the Trump administration family separation policy were actually actors.

In August 2018, Trump Jr. shared on Instagram a doctored image which had been crudely edited to falsely state that CNN had reported President Trump's approval rating as 50%. The actual CNN report had Trump at 40%, below Barack Obama's 45% at the same point of his presidency. Trump Jr. deleted the image two days later.

In September 2018, when Hurricane Florence was affecting the United States, Trump Jr. tweeted a picture of CNN journalist Anderson Cooper waist-deep in floodwaters when another man in the same picture was standing knee-deep a distance away. In the same tweet, Trump Jr. included a link to a Breitbart News article claiming that CNN's ratings had dropped by 41%, and proposed a conspiracy theory that CNN was "lying to try to make [his father, President Trump] look bad". In actuality, the picture of Cooper was about 10 years old, taken during 2008's Hurricane Ike before Trump became president, and Cooper was videoed talking about how the floodwaters were receding.

In May 2020, Trump Jr. falsely accused Joe Biden of being a pedophile.

In August 2020, Trump Jr. shared a Breitbart News article about more than 800 dead people voting in Michigan which was framed to suggest that the ballots were not legitimately cast and thus evidence of extensive voter fraud; however, the voters in question died after submitting the ballots, and the ballots were rejected by Michigan authorities who knew the voters had died before the election date. In September 2020, he again pushed false claims about voter fraud by asserting, "The radical left are laying the groundwork to steal this election from my father." He added: "Their plan is to add millions of fraudulent ballots that can cancel your vote and overturn the election," and asked "able-bodied" people to join an election security "army" for his father. Facebook and Twitter affixed labels to the video which pointed to accurate information about voting.

In November 2020, after Pfizer announced that it had developed a COVID-19 vaccine with 90% effectiveness, Trump Jr. suggested that the vaccine had been held back in order to hurt his father's chances of winning the election. Pfizer CEO Albert Bourla dismissed the suggestion, saying that the company had always planned to rely on the "speed of science."

After Russia invaded Ukraine in February 2022, Trump Jr. amplified baseless Russian state propaganda which claimed that the US and Ukraine were developing biological weapons.

COVID-19 misinformation
Trump Jr. was given a 12-hour restriction by Twitter in July 2020 after he promoted misinformation about COVID-19 by retweeting a video showing Houston doctor Stella Immanuel promoting hydroxychloroquine as a cure despite conflicting studies, and claiming that masks are unnecessary. Twitter later said that it restricted the ability to tweet or retweet for twelve hours for violating its COVID-19 misinformation policy.

On October 29, 2020, Trump Jr. criticized the media's focus on new infections rather than on deaths, saying on Fox News, "why aren't they talking about deaths? Oh, oh, because the number is almost nothing. Because we've gotten control of this, and we understand how it works." On the day Trump Jr. made that comment, the United States registered roughly 1,000 COVID-19 deaths.

Other
In 2016, Trump Jr. posted a photo on Instagram featuring a Trump version of Pepe the Frog, an internet meme used by white nationalists and white supremacists. Trump Jr. defended the post and called criticism of it "ridiculous".

On October 31, 2017, Trump Jr. tweeted that he would take away half his three-year-old daughter's Halloween candy because, he wrote, "it's never too early to teach her about socialism."

On November 7, 2017, he posted tweets urging voters in Virginia's gubernatorial election to vote "tomorrow", the day after the election.

In November 2019, Trump Jr. tweeted the name of the alleged whistleblower who brought to light the Trump-Ukraine scandal. Whistleblower conventions are intended to protect the identity of individuals who expose wrongdoing in government. Agence France-Presse attempted to independently verify the identity that Trump Jr. tweeted, but was unable to do so.

In June 2020, during the COVID-19 pandemic, Trump Jr. accused liberals of hypocrisy, for imposing restrictive measures and social distancing guidelines on businesses while holding the "Action for Black Trans Lives" protest for the rights of African-American transgender people.

Trump Jr. has accused big tech companies of being biased against conservatives and has claimed that a deep state sought to undermine Trump during his presidency.

Attempts to overturn the 2020 election

Trump has had a prominent role in his father's attempts to overturn the 2020 United States presidential election since November 2020. He has threatened Republican lawmakers who did not help his father overturn the election. In November 2020, he advocated "total war" instead of completion of vote counting in the 2020 United States elections.

CNN reported in April 2022 that two days after the election, Trump Jr. sent a text message to White House Chief of Staff Mark Meadows outlining paths to subvert the Electoral College process and ensure his father a second term. He wrote, "It's very simple. We have multiple paths. We control them all. We have operational control. Total leverage. Moral high ground. POTUS must start second term now." He continued, "Republicans control 28 states Democrats 22 states. Once again Trump wins," adding, "We either have a vote WE control and WE win OR it gets kicked to Congress 6 January 2021." Biden had not yet been declared the winner at the time of the text.

Relation to the 2021 Capitol riot 

Together with his father and other speakers, on January 6, 2021, Trump Jr. spoke to an audience and, speaking about reluctant GOP lawmakers saying, "If you're gonna be the zero and not the hero, we're coming for you." President Trump further incited the crowd which then marched to the US Capitol building, where they forced entry, broke windows and vandalized the building. One woman was killed, and a police officer and three other people died during or shortly after the incursion.
  
Television host and former congressman Joe Scarborough called for the arrest of Trump Jr., along with his father and Rudolph Giuliani, for insurrection against the United States. Following his father's permanent ban from Twitter on January 8, 2021, Donald Trump Jr. claimed that free speech "no longer exists in America."

On March 5, 2021, Representative Eric Swalwell filed a civil lawsuit against Trump Jr. and three others (his father, Representative Mo Brooks, and Rudy Giuliani), seeking damages for their alleged role in inciting the riot.

In December 2021, text messages released by Meadows revealed that Trump Jr. begged Meadows to persuade his father to stop the attack.

Criminal investigation

On January 11, 2021, D.C. attorney general Karl Racine said that Donald Trump Jr. is a person of interest in the criminal investigation of the attack on the U.S. Capitol and that he is looking at whether to charge him, along with Rudy Giuliani and Mo Brooks, with inciting the violent attack.

Fraud investigation
On January 14, 2021, it became known that Trump Jr. is a person of interest in the criminal investigation into misuse of his father's inaugural funds in Washington D.C., and that prosecutors intend to interview him over his role in "grossly overpaying" for use of event space at the Trump Hotel in Washington for the 2017 inauguration.

Books

Triggered: How the Left Thrives on Hate and Wants to Silence Us

In 2019, Trump Jr. released the book, Triggered: How the Left Thrives on Hate and Wants to Silence Us. The book is critical of political correctness, and argues that the American left has a victimhood complex. The Washington Post commented: "yet, in his telling, the real victim is often him, his father or another Trump family member." In the book, Trump Jr. pushes conspiracy theories about how the intelligence community has attempted to harm President Trump, comparing President Trump's experiences with the FBI harassment campaign against civil rights leader Martin Luther King Jr. Trump Jr. wrote of a visit to Arlington National Cemetery (a military cemetery), commenting that he got emotional looking at the graves and that it reminded him of "all the sacrifices" the Trump family had made, including "voluntarily giving up a huge chunk of our business and all international deals to avoid the appearance that we were 'profiting off of the office'". Fact-checkers have reported that Trump still owns the family business, and that the Trump family have continued to engage in international business deals since Trump became president. In a review for The Washington Post, Carlos Lozada said that it "fails as memoir and as polemic: Its analysis is facile, its hypocrisy relentless, its self-awareness marginal. (The writing is wretched, even by the standards of political vanity projects.)"

The book was a New York Times best-seller. The book was purchased in bulk by at least nine Republican organizations, candidates or advocacy groups, including N.R.C.C. and the RNC which bought $75,000 and $100,000 worth of the books, respectively. Turning Point USA and the National Republican Senatorial Committee purchased approximately 2,000 and 2,500 books, respectively.

Liberal Privilege: Joe Biden and the Democrats' Defense of the Indefensible 

In 2020, Trump Jr. self-published the book Liberal Privilege: Joe Biden and the Democrats' Defense of the Indefensible. Trump Jr. reportedly hired three researchers to collect information about Joe Biden and spent three months writing the book. Trump Jr. explained to The New York Times his reasons: "While I had no plans for a book this year, I was stuck indoors like the rest of the nation during the pandemic," he said, adding that he "decided to highlight Biden's half century of being a swamp monster, since the media wouldn't do it." The same article stated that he decided to self-publish because he could count on the publicity of "his own platformand the promise of bulk purchases from the RNC".

The book was indeed bought in bulk by the RNC. On October 28, 2020, the RNC paid over $300,000 of donor money to Pursuit Venture LLC, a company owned by Trump Jr., for "donor mementos." It was the most money the RNC had ever paid for this purpose. The hardcover retails for $29.99, which suggests roughly how many copies might have been purchased, and the RNC's intent was to give a copy to people who donated $50–$100.

Personal life

Family

In 2003, Trump Jr. began dating model Vanessa Kay Haydon at his father's suggestion. The couple married on November 12, 2005, at his father's Mar-a-Lago estate in Palm Beach, Florida; the service was officiated by Trump Jr.'s aunt, Judge Maryanne Trump Barry. Haydon's grandfather was Danish jazz musician Kai Ewans. They have five children: daughter Kai Madison (b. May 2007), son Donald John III (b. February 2009), son Tristan Milos (b. October 2011), son Spencer Frederick (b. October 2012), and daughter Chloe Sophia (b. June 2014). The oldest daughter, Kai, is named after Kai's great-grandfather, Kai Ewans.

On March 15, 2018, it was announced that the couple had separated and she had filed for uncontested divorce in Manhattan Supreme Court. However, later it was revealed that the divorce was contested. The complaint was secret except for the title of the case. On February 22, 2019, they announced that they settled their divorce at the end of 2018.

Since 2018, Trump Jr. has been dating Kimberly Guilfoyle. Guilfoyle had been friends with the Trump family for years. The two reportedly became engaged on December 31, 2020, though news of the engagement was not made public until January 2022. In December 2021, Trump Jr. switched his official residency from New York to Florida.

Hunting
Trump Jr. is an enthusiastic hunter. Controversy erupted in 2012 when the pictures he had taken of his hunting trophies in 2010 were published, including by Mia Farrow, who reposted them in 2015 and 2019. Trump Jr. responded by saying "I'm not going to run and hide because the peta [sic] crazies don't like me." In one photo, Trump Jr. has his arms around a dead leopard; in another, he is holding a knife in one hand and a bloody elephant tail in the other. Although the hunt was legal, anti-hunting activists criticized him. At least one sponsor dropped his father's TV show The Celebrity Apprentice. On Earth Day in 2017, Trump Jr. legally hunted prairie dogs in Montana with GOP Congressional candidate Greg Gianforte. Controversy over Trump Jr.'s big game hunting exploits surfaced again in November 2017, following the Trump administration's decision to allow "importing elephant heads, feet and other body parts severed as trophies after the animals are shot for sport in Zimbabwe." Within hours, President Trump reversed the decision to allow elephant trophies imported from Zambia and Zimbabwe, pending further review. By March 2018 President Trump quietly lifted the ban again, allowing elephant trophies to be imported.

ProPublica revealed on December 11, 2019, that the government of Mongolia retroactively granted Trump Jr. a hunting permit for the endangered Argali mountain sheep. The sheep hunt and travel to Ulaanbaatar for a private meeting with Mongolian president Khaltmaagiin Battulga cost US taxpayers $76,859.36 for United States Secret Service protection, according to two Freedom of Information Act requests by the Citizens for Responsibility and Ethics in Washington (CREW). Humane Society International wildlife vice president Teresa Telecky said, "For trophy hunters to travel to Mongolia to kill a beautiful and endangered ram is an absolute outrage."

In February 2020 Trump agreed to go on a hunting trip in Alaska with the winner of a fundraising auction for the Safari Club International.

Health 
On November 20, 2020, Trump Jr. tested positive for COVID-19. After testing positive, Trump Jr. went into isolation.

See also 
 Business projects of Donald Trump in Russia
 Mueller report
 
 Stormy Daniels–Donald Trump scandal
 Timeline of Russian interference in the 2016 United States elections
 Timeline of Russian interference in the 2016 United States elections (July 2016 – election day)
 Timeline of investigations into Donald Trump and Russia

Notes

References

External links 

 Trump Organization biography
 
 

1977 births
Living people
21st-century American businesspeople
21st-century American male writers
21st-century American writers
American business executives
American conspiracy theorists
American construction businesspeople
American hunters
American nationalists
American people of Austrian descent
American people of German descent
American people of Moravian descent
American people of Scottish descent
American real estate businesspeople
Buckley School (New York City) alumni
Businesspeople from New York City
Children of presidents of the United States
Critics of Black Lives Matter
The Hill School alumni
New York (state) Republicans
Participants in American reality television series
Right-wing populism in the United States
Donald Jr
The Trump Organization employees
Wharton School of the University of Pennsylvania alumni
Children of Donald Trump